Rogerio Pinheiro dos Santos, known as Rogério Pinheiro in the K-League, (born: April 21, 1972) is a former Brazilian footballer who plays as a defender.

His Korean football career started in 2003. In 2003, Pohang Steelers brought him to the K-League. And in 2006, he moved to Gyeongnam FC.

He previously played domestically for Botafogo FR, São Paulo FC, Fluminense FC, Atlético Mineiro, Portuguesa and CR Vasco da Gama.

External links
 

1972 births
Living people
Association football defenders
Brazilian footballers
Brazilian expatriate footballers
Brazil international footballers
Botafogo de Futebol e Regatas players
São Paulo FC players
Fluminense FC players
Clube Atlético Mineiro players
Associação Portuguesa de Desportos players
CR Vasco da Gama players
Pohang Steelers players
Gyeongnam FC players
K League 1 players
Expatriate footballers in South Korea
People from Angra dos Reis
Brazilian expatriate sportspeople in South Korea
Sportspeople from Rio de Janeiro (state)